The 1939 Marshall Thundering Herd football team was an American football team that represented Marshall University as an independent during the 1939 college football season. In its fifth season under head coach Cam Henderson, the team compiled a 9–2 record and outscored opponents by a total of 286 to 84. "Boot" Elkins and Zack Kush were the team captains.

Schedule

References

Marshall
Marshall Thundering Herd football seasons
Marshall Thundering Herd football